Mage Knight Board Game is a cooperative board game for 1 to 4 players designed by Vlaada Chvátil and released in November 2011. It is based on the related collectable miniatures game, Mage Knight. It has been rated as one of the top single player board games.

Gameplay

In the Mage Knight Board Game a player controls one of four Mage Knights, exploring the Mage Knight universe and fighting against powerful enemies. Players choose between a number of scenarios to play with each scenario having a particular objective to meet, such as conquering cities, controlling land areas, investigating mysteries, etc.. Players create the gameboard using tiles as described within the scenario documentation.

Each character has a 16 cards deck used for actions and movement. Players start with drawing 5 cards from the deck and as characters level up, more cards are drawn. The map is slowly revealed as players move on the board. Enemies are placed on the map as the board is revealed. The game time is tracked using rounds utilizing a Day/Night mechanic. When a players deck is empty at the start of their turn, the round will end and advance to the next Day/Night cycle. The game continues until a predetermined number of game days have elapsed, at which point the game ends. If the objective has been met, as described within the scenario, the players win. If the objective has not been met, the players lose.

Characters 

 Arythea: The Blood Cultist
 Goldyx: The Winged Green Lizard
 Norowas: An Elven Leader
 Tovak Wyrmstalker: A Knight
 Braevelar: A Druid (Shades of Tesla Expansion)
 Wolfhawk  A Solitary Warrior (Lost Legion Expansion)
 Krang: A trollish chieftain/shaman (Krang Character Expansion)

Expansions and Re-releases

Three distinct expansions released for Mage Knight:

 Mage Knight Board Game: The Lost Legion was released in December 2012.
 Mage Knight Board Game: Krang Character was released in 2013
 Mage Knight Board Game: Shades of Tezla was released in July 2015

Mage Knight Board Game: Ultimate Edition was released in December 2018 by WizKids. The Ultimate Edition included the base game along with all of three previously released expansions. Mage Knight: Dual Color Card Expansion was released in 2019 and included cards that were previously only contained within the Ultimate Edition.

In July 2016, the Star Trek: Frontiers board game was released utilizing gameplay and systems from Mage Knight Board Game.

Critical Reception

The overall reception of the board game was positive.  Entropymag says that the game "stand(s) apart from even the best sandboxes found in electronic games." TechRaptor rated it a 10.0 and described it as "one of the best, if not the best, solo game on the market." Board Games Land similarly mentioned that it "holds the crown as the best solo board game" and The Thoughtful Gamer said "you know it’s going to be difficult, but in the end it’s going to be a rewarding experience."

Within the first month of the game's release it was sold out due to an overwhelming response, prompting a second release.

Awards and honors

 2011 Nominee for Dice Tower's Best Game of the Year Award for  
 2012 International Gamers Awards: Nominee in the General Strategy category 
 2012 Golden Geek Award for Most Thematic Board Game from Board Game Geek.
 2013 Origins Awards Best Board Game Nominee
 2012 Spiel der Spiele Hit für Experten Recommended
 2012 Golden Geek Most Innovative Board Game Nominee
In 2019, Mage Knight Board Game was inducted into the Origins Award Hall of Fame.

References

External links 
 Mage Knight Rulebook
 Mage Knight at BoardGameGeek

Board games
Cooperative board games
Cooperative games
Board games introduced in 2011